Hawk Mountain is a  mountain summit located in Jasper National Park in Alberta, Canada. It is located near the northwest end of the Colin Range, which is a sub-range of the Canadian Rockies. Its nearest higher peak is Mount Colin,  to the southeast. Hawk Mountain was named in 1916 by Morrison P. Bridgland for the fact that a hawk was flying near the summit at the time it was named. Bridgland (1878-1948) was a Dominion Land Surveyor who named many peaks in Jasper Park and the Canadian Rockies. The mountain's name was officially adopted in 1956 by the Geographical Names Board of Canada.

Climate
Based on the Köppen climate classification, Hawk Mountain is located in a subarctic climate zone with cold, snowy winters, and mild summers. Precipitation runoff from Hawk Mountain flows into the Athabasca River.

See also
 Geography of Alberta

References

External links
 Parks Canada web site: Jasper National Park

Two-thousanders of Alberta
Canadian Rockies
Mountains of Jasper National Park
Alberta's Rockies